Landmark Pinnacle is a  skyscraper constructed by developer Chalegrove Properties in Marsh Wall on the Isle of Dogs, London, United Kingdom. The 75-storeys Landmark Pinnacle is the tallest residential tower in the United Kingdom, the tallest residential building in western Europe and has more habitable floors than any other building in western Europe. As of 2023, Landmark Pinnacle is the fourth tallest building in the United Kingdom. The development was formerly known as City Pride, the same name as the public house it replaced, before a name change in 2016.

Site history

The City Pride public house was formerly the only building on the site and closed in 2012. Oracle Group purchased the freehold in 2007 for £6.75 million and sold it to Glenkerrin for £32 million in 2008. Landmark North Ltd and UK Power Network Holdings purchased the site (and the associated Island Point site) from the administrators of Glenkerrin for £43 million in 2011.

In 2016, a development loan of £320 million was agreed in order to continue with construction.

Planning
Chalegrove Properties registered a planning application with Tower Hamlets in December 2012 for the erection of a residential-led mixed-use tower of 75 floors comprising 822 residential units and 162 serviced apartments and associated amenities. The application was permitted (subject to conditions) on 9 October 2013. The application is subject to a Section 106 Agreement with a total amount payable to Tower Hamlets of £5,182,279.

Island Point
Chalegrove Properties registered a planning application in December 2012 for a development of 173 homes at a site located at 443-451 Westferry Road, in a linked application with what was then known as the City Pride development to fulfil the affordable housing conditions. The application was permitted (subject to conditions) on 9 October 2013. The application was subject to a Section 106 Agreement with a total amount payable to Tower Hamlets of £4,069,361 (including £2,734,636 for the provision of educational facilities in the Borough).

Gallery

References

External links
 Official site
 

Canary Wharf buildings
Skyscrapers in the London Borough of Tower Hamlets
Buildings and structures in the London Borough of Tower Hamlets
Millwall